Peetschsee is a lake in Mecklenburgische Seenplatte, Mecklenburgische Seenplatte, Mecklenburg-Vorpommern, Germany. At an elevation of 59.1 m, its surface area is 0.33 km².

Lakes of Mecklenburg-Western Pomerania